Federal Hill may refer to:

In Malaysia:
 Federal Hill, Kuala Lumpur, Malaysia

In the United States:
 Federal Hill, a mansion featured on Kentucky's State Quarter and the centerpiece of My Old Kentucky Home State Park in Bardstown, Kentucky
 Federal Hill (Delaware County, New York), an elevation
 Federal Hill, Baltimore, Maryland, a neighborhood and a park (earlier site of celebration by Baltimore Town citizens over ratification of the U.S. Constitution in 1788, observation post and tower for arriving ships and later of a former Union Army fort overlooking downtown Baltimore and its harbor basin - Inner Harbor during the Civil War)
 Federal Hill, Providence, Rhode Island, an historic neighborhood and "Little Italy" in Providence, Rhode Island
 Federal Hill (film), a 1994 movie sited in Providence, Rhode Island
Federal Hill (Forest, Virginia), listed on the National Register of Historic Places in Campbell County, Virginia
Federal Hill (Fredericksburg, Virginia), listed on the National Register of Historic Places in Fredericksburg, Virginia
Federal Hill, New Jersey, location of the Pompton Mutiny during the Revolutionary War

See also
Federal Hill Historic District (disambiguation)